Brother to Brother is the sixth studio album by Canadian singer Gino Vannelli.  Despite its success - the biggest of Vannelli's career - it was also his last for A&M Records. The album was released in 1978 and featured "I Just Wanna Stop", Vannelli's highest-charting single to date in both the US and Canada, where the single reached #4 and #1 respectively.  Two other singles were released from the LP, "Wheels of Life" (U.S. #78, Canada #31), and "The River Must Flow" (Canada #80).

Track listing

Charts

Year-end charts

Personnel 
 Gino Vannelli – lead vocals, synthesizer (Korg PS-3300)
 Joe Vannelli – electric piano, synthesizers 
 Carlos Rios – guitars
 Leon Gaer – synthesized electric bass (1-4, 7, 8)
 Jimmy Haslip – electric bass (5, 6, 9), bass solo (6)
 Mark Craney – drums
 Manolo Badrena – percussion
 Victor Feldman – vibraphone
 Ernie Watts – tenor saxophone
 Stephanie Spruill – backing vocals
 Julia Waters – backing vocals
 Maxine Waters – backing vocals
 Ross Vannelli – backing vocals

Production 
 Produced and Arranged by Gino Vannelli, Joe Vannelli and Ross Vannelli.
 Engineered and Mixed by Norm Kinney
 Assistant Engineer – Chris Desmond
 Remixing Assistants – Paul Aronoff and Betty Banghart
 Mastered by Bernie Grundman at A&M Studios (Hollywood, CA).
 Art Direction – Roland Young 
 Design – Grafis
 Photography – Mark Hanauer

References

External links
 

Gino Vannelli albums
1978 albums
A&M Records albums